George Albertus Cox (May 7, 1840 – January 16, 1914) was a very prominent Canadian businessman and a member of the Senate of Canada.

Life and career
He was born in Colborne, Upper Canada, in 1840. He began work as a telegrapher for the Montreal Telegraph Company (acquired by the Great North Western Telegraph Company in 1881 and finally merged into Canadian National Telegraph in 1915) and became their agent in Peterborough, Ontario. In 1861, he became an agent for the Canada Life Assurance Company. He served seven years as mayor of Peterborough and accumulated real estate in that area.

In 1878, he became president of the Midland Railway of Canada, later leasing it to the Grand Trunk Railway. In 1884, he founded the Central Canada Loan and Savings Company, moving to Toronto in 1888 and becoming president of the Canadian Bank of Commerce in 1890.

During the 1890s, he was involved in the purchase of the Toronto Globe and the Toronto Evening Star. In 1896, he was appointed to the Senate of Canada by Sir Wilfrid Laurier. In 1898, Cox and Edward Rogers Wood incorporated the National Trust Company in Toronto, which became the Scotia Trust in 1997 and part of the Bank of Nova Scotia. In 1900, he became president and general manager of Canada Life Assurance. In 1901, Cox and Edward R. Wood established investment dealer Dominion Securities Corporation Limited, today a part of the Royal Bank of Canada.

By this time, he controlled many of the important Canadian companies in the insurance and finance sectors. His companies helped finance the Canadian Northern Railway, the Crow's Nest Pass Coal Company, and utilities developments in Brazil which became consolidated under Brazilian Traction, Light and Power Company. Cox was one of the few Canadian millionaires of his era. A number of notable Canadians got their start in Cox companies: William Thomas White, James Henry Gundy, Edward Robert Peacock, and Frank Porter Wood, the younger brother of Edward Rogers Wood.

He was also a member of the Executive Committee of the Victorian Order of Nurses, a founding member of the Canadian Red Cross and an active member of the Methodist Church. He died in Toronto in 1914 and was buried in Mount Pleasant Cemetery, Toronto.

References

External links 
 
 
 

1840 births
1914 deaths
Canadian bank presidents
Canadian Imperial Bank of Commerce
Canadian Methodists
Canadian senators from Ontario
Candidates in the 1887 Canadian federal election
Liberal Party of Canada senators
Pre-Confederation Canadian businesspeople
Persons of National Historic Significance (Canada)
Liberal Party of Canada candidates for the Canadian House of Commons